Latisha Chan and Martina Hingis were the defending champions, but Hingis retired from professional tennis at the end of 2017 and Chan could not participate due to a medical condition.

Elise Mertens and Demi Schuurs won the title, defeating Andrea Sestini Hlaváčková and Barbora Strýcová in the final, 6–3, 6–3.

Seeds
The top four seeds received a bye into the second round.

Draw

Finals

Top half

Bottom half

External links 
 Main draw

Doubles